David James Silvester (born 26 December 1958) is a Scottish numerical analyst. He has a Chair in Numerical Analysis and is the Head of Applied Mathematics in the Department of Mathematics at the University of Manchester.

Silvester was born in Dumfries, but was educated at Ysgol Ardudwy (Wales) and the University of Manchester Institute of Science and Technology (UMIST), from which he gained his B.Sc. in Mathematics (1980) and Ph.D. in Numerical Analysis (1983). His Ph.D. thesis (An Analysis of Finite Element Approximation for Swirling Flow) was supervised by Ronald Thatcher. He was appointed lecturer in Mathematics at UMIST in 1984, and later promoted to Senior Lecturer and Reader. In 2003 he was promoted to a personal Chair of Numerical Analysis. Silvester held visiting positions in the Computer Science Department at Stanford University in 1991 (as a Fulbright Senior Fellow) and in 1999, at the University of Maryland (1994), the University of the Littoral Opal Coast (2009), and the University of Heidelberg (2019).

Silvester is best known for his work on finite element methods, fast iterative solvers for fluid dynamics, and uncertainty quantification. He has more than 65 refereed publications on topics such as iterative solution of Stokes and Navier–Stokes systems, preconditioning, and error estimation in finite element methods. Silvester's books include Finite Elements and Fast Iterative Solvers: With Applications in Incompressible Fluid Dynamics and Essential Partial Differential Equations.

Silvester has served as the elected President of the UK and Republic of Ireland section of the Society for Industrial and Applied Mathematics (2009–2011). He is on the editorial board of the Journal of Scientific Computing.

References

External links
 Homepage
 
 

1958 births
Living people
Academics of the University of Manchester
Alumni of the University of Manchester Institute of Science and Technology
20th-century British mathematicians
21st-century British mathematicians
Numerical analysts
People from Dumfries